Garra nigricauda is a species of cyprinid fish in the genus Garra which is found in the Brahmaputra River, Arunachal Pradesh, India.

References 

Garra
Fish described in 2013